Per Otto Furuseth (born 14 October 1947) is a Norwegian team handball player and coach, and sports official.

Furuseth played 62 matches for the Norway men's national handball team during his active career, and played on club level for Refstad IL. He was head coach for Norway's national team from 1979 to 1985. In 2003 he was appointed Secretary General for the Norwegian Handball Federation.

References

1947 births
Living people
Norwegian male handball players
Norwegian handball coaches
Norwegian sports executives and administrators